Paweł Podsiadło (born 29 March 1986) is a Polish handball player for KS Azoty-Puławy and the Polish national team.

References

1986 births
Living people
Polish male handball players
Sportspeople from Kielce
Vive Kielce players